Inocente Fiss Carballosa (born June 7, 1980) is a Cuban boxer best known to win bronze at the 2005 World Amateur Boxing Championships in the men's junior welterweight division.

Amateur career

In 1998 he won a bronze at the junior world championships, when he lost the semifinal to Yuri Tomashov. He became Cuban champion in 2005 and 2006, where he beat Carlos Banteaux 24:23 in the final. At the seniors 2005 World Championships he defeated Boris Georgiev but lost the semis against Dilshod Mahmudov.

He was part of the Cuban team that won the 2006 Boxing World Cup.

He did not participate at the 2007 national championships, but was sent to the PanAm Games 2007 where he was upset by Jonathan Gonzalez (PR) in the semis and won a bronze, too. He did not participate in the national championships 2008 where Rosniel Iglesias became the new titleholder.

Defection and turning pro
In early 2010; Fiss, along with 6 other Cuban boxers, defected to the US and settled in Miami.

Fiss currently holds a professional record of 5(3)-0.

References

1998 results
2005 results

1980 births
Living people
Light-welterweight boxers
Boxers at the 2007 Pan American Games
Cuban male boxers
Defecting sportspeople of Cuba
AIBA World Boxing Championships medalists
Pan American Games bronze medalists for Cuba
Pan American Games medalists in boxing
Medalists at the 2007 Pan American Games